Sugar City may refer to a place in the United States:

Sugar City, Colorado
Sugar City, Idaho
Sugar City, Halfweg
 It can also refer to Lautoka, Fiji's second largest city and home to the Pacific's largest sugar mill